The Rio Pinar Golf & Country Club is a semi-private Golf club and Country Club located in Rio Pinar, Florida, a suburban subdivision of Orlando.

History 
Established  in 1957, the golf course was the original site of the Florida Citrus Open (now Arnold Palmer Invitational) on the PGA Tour from 1966 through 1978,  Some of golf's greatest players like Arnold Palmer, Lee Trevino, and Julius Boros won at Rio.

When the tournament relocated to Bay Hill in 1979, Rio Pinar was the site of the LPGA Tour's Lady Citrus Open for four years (1979–1982).

The Mark Mahannah & Lloyd Clifton-designed golf course is just the beginning at Rio Pinar!  The Champions Grill or Lounge is a perfect place to unwind after your game or a perfect get-together with friends. 

The  fine dining room is perfect for evening intimate dinners, or the majestic banquet facilities and meeting rooms are available for weddings, parties, corporate meetings or special events are here for you at Rio Pinar.

Rio Pinar's Golf Academy offers lessons to all levels of players while the full-length driving range can let golfers practice their way to greatness. Rio Pinar has four hard court tennis courts to add an additional recreation choice whether with a partner or in one of the leagues.

Tour winners

PGA Tour

Note: Green highlight indicates scoring records.
Sources:

LPGA Tour

References

External links 

Golf clubs and courses in Greater Orlando
Golf in Orlando, Florida
Sports venues in Orange County, Florida
1957 establishments in Florida
Sports venues completed in 1957